James Clark (born 12 March 1963) was a British diplomat. He served as the British Ambassador to Luxembourg from 2004 to 2007 and now leads the British Consulate General in Chicago. He was called "a new breed of diplomat" by The Times. A career diplomat, he was assigned to the European Union first secretariat in Bonn, Germany.

Clark's appointment as British Ambassador to Luxembourg in March 2004 was heralded with some small controversy, due largely to his being openly gay.

On 30 March 2004, he and his partner Anthony Stewart made history by becoming the first officially recognised gay couple to have an audience with Queen Elizabeth II.

References

 

1963 births
Living people
Ambassadors of the United Kingdom to Luxembourg
English LGBT people
Place of birth missing (living people)
Gay diplomats
British LGBT civil servants